Caecum swinneni is a species of minute sea snail, a marine gastropod mollusk or micromollusk in the family Caecidae.

Description

Distribution

References

Caecidae
Gastropods described in 1997